The Force: Behind the Line is an Australian documentary television series about the Western Australia Police and the New South Wales Police, hosted by Simon Reeve and aired nationally on the Seven Network from 22 August 2006. Similarly to Border Security: Australia's Front Line and the American Cops series, each episode intermixes three or four investigations per episode.

Format
The Force is filmed in metropolitan and regional Western Australia and New South Wales. Small camera crews follow the police around during their daily duties. Field producer Tim Noonan said the only rule in filming was that the camera crews "can't hinder [the police] in any way". As a result, some footage is filmed from police cars or a safe distance away from the police, with wireless microphones used to record audio.

The Western Australian Police retained the right to veto any material which posed legal problems, such as footage identifying underage offenders or matters before the courts. Techniques such as pixelisation are used to satisfy legal requirements. The program also blurred out the faces of police officers not wishing to be identified on national television.

Episodes of The Force comprise three or four individual stories featuring police officers going about everyday duties, including burglaries, drug-related cases, traffic cases and murder investigations. The choice of stories is usually balanced to include action-oriented stories as well as lighter stories such as family disputes.

History
The Seven Network first announced The Force (then untitled) on 23 November 2005. The program underwent a number of name changes, including Police Patrol and True Blue, before the eventual title was finally announced in June 2006.

The Western Australia Police was the only police service to agree to be filmed in the first two series of the show. Lawyers for the Western Australia Police opposed the move, but Police Commissioner Karl O'Callaghan convinced them otherwise. O'Callaghan was keen for the project, and viewed the program as "a great opportunity to give the community a better understanding of the good and bad parts of policing." A third season began airing in February 2008. The 12th season premiered on 27 July 2016.

As of October 2017 season 1-3 are available on Tubi TV in the United States.

Episodes

Season 1

Season 2

Season 3

Season 4

Season 03

Season 04

Season 05

Season 06

Season 07

Season 08

Season 09

Season 10 (2016)

Season 11 (2017)

Season 12 (2018, 2019 & 2020)

Reception

Ratings

The premiere of The Force was popular with Australian viewers, receiving 2.295 million viewers in metropolitan areas, making it highest rating Australian premiere in 2006. The premiere was the second highest rating program of the week behind Border Security (2.298 million), although The Force outrated Border Security in both Sydney, New South Wales and Perth, Western Australia. The program rated particularly high in Perth due to the program's focus on Western Australian crimes, and a local marketing campaign which emphasised this fact.

Commenting on the program's top ratings, Tim Worner, director of programming and production at the Seven Network, said The Force had surpassed expectation and described the program as one of Seven's "hit shows". The second episode maintained the program's high ratings, achieving an audience of 1.956 million viewers.

The Force experienced a significant drop in numbers following its move to Wednesday night. Critics blamed the lack of lead-in from Border Security and tough competition from Network Ten's Thank God You're Here for the lower ratings. The first series averaged 1.453 million viewers across metropolitan markets, making it the 19th most watched regular program in 2006.

Critical reviews
Television critic Robin Oliver (The Sydney Morning Herald) claimed that The Force "achieves some of the best reality television of its kind. There is no sense of playing to cameras and it has an element of surprise that catches both officers and camera crews wrong-footed."  Oliver did criticise the show, however, of being "too fast... jumping from one story to another in irritatingly quick succession."

Graeme Blundell (The Australian) noted the tabloid nature of the program, and that "issues are rarely explored beyond the simple events in the frame." He continued that despite being "sophisticated TV", The Force often felt like "a corporate training film for clean-cut police units in the WA police force."

References

External links
 The Force – Official website
 

Australian factual television series
Seven Network original programming
Police procedural television series
2006 Australian television series debuts
2000s Australian documentary television series
2010s Australian documentary television series
2020s Australian documentary television series
Television shows set in Perth, Western Australia
Documentary television series about policing